= Richmond Osei-Hwere =

Ghanaian judge

Richmond Osei-Hwere is a Ghanaian judge, legal scholar and academic who serves as a Justice of the Court of Appeal of Ghana. Before his appointment to the Court of Appeal in 2025, he served as a Justice of the High Court of Ghana, including as the High Court in Kumasi and the High Court in the Western Region. His academic and professional work has included petroleum and natural resources law, dispute resolution, corporate responsibility and other areas of Ghanaian law.

Osei-Hwere has also taught law at tertiary institutions in Ghana. His academic profile records qualifications including a PhD, LL.M., LL.B. and professional legal training, while his published work has focused particularly on Ghana's petroleum regulatory framework and the legal management of oil and gas resources.

== Education ==
Osei-Hwere studied law at the Kwame Nkrumah University of Science and Technology (KNUST). His academic profile at Presbyterian University identifies him as holding an LL.B and an LL.M. in addition to a PhD and professional legal qualification.

His doctoral research was undertaken at the University of Aberdeen in Scotland and focused on Ghana's petroleum regulatory regime. A later academic thesis citing his doctoral research identifies his 2015 PhD thesis as "Conflict of Interest Challenges Facing Ghana's Petroleum Commission Under the Petroleum Commission Act, 2011(Act 821): Proposal for Reform".

== Legal and academic career ==
Osei-Hwere worked in legal practice before becoming a judge and also developed a career in legal education. By the 2010s, he was teaching law while working in the legal profession and later serving on the High Court. KNUST records show that Osei-Hwere served as an Assistant Lecturer in the Faculty of Law before leaving full-time university employment.

He subsequently continued his involvement in legal education as part of a part-time or adjunct lecturer. Presbyterian University Lists him as a Lecturer (Part-Time) in its Faculty of Law and Identifies his research as conflict and dispute resolution, oil and gas regulation, and corporate responsibility in the management of oil and gas resources.

He is also associated with teaching and professional training at KNUST. A KNUST programme document lists Justice Dr. Richmond Osei-Hwere as a facilitator for courses in its Security and Justice Administration Programme.
